is a Japanese mathematician, who specializes in stable and unstable homotopy theory.

He started publishing in 1952. Many of his early papers are concerned with the study of Whitehead products and their behaviour under suspension and more generally with the (unstable) homotopy groups of spheres. In a 1957 paper he showed the first non-existence result for the Hopf invariant 1 problem. This period of his work culminated in his book Composition methods in homotopy groups of spheres (1962). Here he uses as important tools the Toda bracket (which he calls the toric construction) and the Toda fibration, among others, to compute the first 20 nontrivial homotopy groups for each sphere.

Among his most important contributions to stable homotopy theory is his work on the existence and non-existence of so-called Toda–Smith complexes. These are finite complexes which can be characterized as having a particularly simple ordinary homology (as modules over the Steenrod algebra) or, alternatively, by having a particularly simple BP-homology. They can be used to construct the Greek letter infinite families in the stable homotopy groups of spheres. In his paper On spectra realizing exterior parts of the Steenrod algebra (1971), Toda deduced several existence and non-existence results on these complexes. The existence parts are still unsurpassed.

Toda did also important work on the algebraic topology of (exceptional) Lie groups.

References

External links
 
 List of Publications
 Talk on Toda's Work by Frank Adams

20th-century Japanese mathematicians
21st-century Japanese mathematicians
1928 births
Living people
Topologists